George Goodman (1930–2014) was an American economics commentator known also as "Adam Smith".

George Goodman may also refer to:

 George Goodman (politician) (c. 1792–1859), English politician, Member of Parliament for Leeds
 George Goodman (RAF officer) (1920–1941), Battle of Britain pilot
 George Goodman (Royal Navy officer) (1900–1945), Royal Navy Volunteer Reserve, awarded the George Cross
 George Goodman, a pseudonym for footballer George Getgood
 George Goodman (table tennis), English table tennis player
 George Nicholas Goodman (1895–1959), mayor of Mesa, Arizona